First Baptist Church and Cook Memorial Building is a historic Baptist church located at Carthage in Jefferson County, New York. The church was built in 1885 and is a vernacular Gothic / Romanesque Revival–style edifice.  It is of brick with stone trim and features asymmetrical massing, a multi-story bell tower, broad cross gables, corbelled brick cornices, stone-capped brick buttresses, and lencet-arched stained glass windows.  The Cook Memorial Building dates to the 1860s-1870s and is a two-story brick dwelling with a variety of Italianate style and late Victorian eclectic features.

It was listed on the National Register of Historic Places in 2005.

References

Churches on the National Register of Historic Places in New York (state)
Baptist churches in New York (state)
Gothic Revival church buildings in New York (state)
Churches completed in 1860
19th-century Baptist churches in the United States
Churches in Jefferson County, New York
National Register of Historic Places in Jefferson County, New York